The SkyCruiser Autogyro SkyCruiser is a series of Hungarian autogyros designed and produced by SkyCruiser Autogyro KFT of Inárcs. It was publicly introduced at the AERO Friedrichshafen airshow in 2014. The aircraft is supplied complete and ready-to-fly.

Design and development
The SkyCruiser features a single main rotor, a two-seats-in tandem open cockpit with a windshield, tricycle landing gear with wheel pants, plus a tail caster and a four-cylinder, liquid and air-cooled, four stroke  Rotax 914 turbocharged engine or modified  turbocharged Rotax 912 in pusher configuration.

The design features an automatic propeller system. When the electronic pre-rotator for the main rotor is engaged the pusher propeller automatically goes to flat pitch and creates no thrust. When the pilot moved the control stick aft to take-off the propeller automatically goes to best climb setting.

In 2011 an improved version was introduced called the SC-200 "New Face", with aesthetic changes, including a more rounded cockpit fairing and wider cockpit seating. The original model was then renamed the "SC-200 Standard".

Specifications (SkyCruiser)

See also
List of rotorcraft

References

External links

Skycruiser
2010s Hungarian sport aircraft
Homebuilt aircraft
Single-engined pusher autogyros